Platteville is an unincorporated community in Gay and Jefferson Townships, Taylor County, Iowa, United States.

History
Founded in the 1800s, Platteville's population was 75 in 1902.

References

Unincorporated communities in Taylor County, Iowa
Unincorporated communities in Iowa